Sani Shuwaram was a top commander of the Islamic State's West Africa Province (ISWAP), one of the Islamic State's non-Middle Eastern branches. Non-IS sources claimed that he was sworn in as the wali of ISWAP in November 2021 by one of ISWAP's provincial judges, Bukar Arge, in an ISWAP camp in the village of Kurnawa in the Lake Chad area, Borno State, Nigeria.

Two previous ISWAP top commanders, Abu Musab al-Barnawi and Malam Bako were killed within a few days of one another by the Nigerian Army.

Shuwaram was appointed by Abu Musab al-Barnawi's interim committee following a command directive from the Islamic State's main branch in the Middle East.

Shuwaram was killed in February 2022 by airstrikes by Nigerian Air Force and is expected to be replaced by Bako Gorgore.

References 

Year of birth missing
20th-century births
2022 deaths
Islamic State of Iraq and the Levant members
Leaders of Islamic terror groups
Boko Haram members
Nigerian Islamists
Deaths by airstrike